Martin Echtler (born 14 January 1969) is a German ski mountaineer. He also competes in mountain running.

Echtler was born in Peiting. His sister Christine Echtler-Schleich is also member of the German skimountaineering team.

Selected results

Ski mountaineering 
 2003:
 5th, Mountain Attack race
 2004:
 1st, Dammkarwurm race
 2nd, Mountain Attack race
 2005: 
 3rd, German Championship single
 3rd, Mountain Attack
 10th, Trofeo Mezzalama (together with Wolfgang Panzer and Franz Graßl)
 2006:
 2nd, German Championship single
 5th, World Championship relay race (together with Toni Steurer, Franz Graßl and Georg Nickaes)
 2007:
 1st, German Championship vertical race
 2nd, German Championship single
 1st, Mountain Attack
 4th, Sellaronda Skimarathon (together with Heinz Verbnjak)
 4th, European Championship relay race (together with Toni Steurer, Konrad Lex and Stefan Klinger)
 2008:
 2nd, German Championship team
 2010:
 9th, World Championship relay race (together with Konrad Lex, Andreas Strobel and Alexander Schuster)

Patrouille des Glaciers 

 2006: 7th (and 2nd "seniors II" ranking) as well as German record, Patrouille des Glaciers ("seniors II" ranking), together with Franz Graßl and Toni Steurer
 2010: 9th ("ISMF men" ranking), together with Konrad Lex and Josef Rottmoser

Mountain running 
 2004:
 1st, Zugspitzlauf (Zugspitze run)
 2006:
 1st, Zugspitzlauf
 2007:
 1st, Zugspitzlauf
 2008:
 1st, Zugspitzlauf

External links 
 Martin Echtler at skimountaineering.com

References 

1969 births
Living people
German male ski mountaineers
People from Weilheim-Schongau
Sportspeople from Upper Bavaria